The Jacques Range is a mountain range in the Front Ranges of the Canadian Rockies, located south of Highway 16 and Jasper Lake in Jasper National Park, Alberta, Canada.

This range includes the following mountains and peaks:

References 

Mountain ranges of Alberta
Ranges of the Canadian Rockies